Tracee Joy Silberstein (born October 29, 1972), known professionally as Tracee Ellis Ross, is an American actress. She is known for her lead roles in the television series Girlfriends (2000–2008) and Black-ish (2014–2022).

She is the daughter of actress and Motown recording artist Diana Ross and Robert Ellis Silberstein. She began acting in independent films and variety series. She hosted the pop-culture magazine The Dish on Lifetime. From 2000 to 2008 she played the starring role of Joan Clayton in the UPN/CW comedy series Girlfriends, for which she received two NAACP Image Awards for Outstanding Actress in a Comedy Series. She also has appeared in the films Hanging Up (2000), I-See-You.Com (2006), and Daddy's Little Girls (2007), before returning to television playing Dr. Carla Reed on the BET sitcom Reed Between the Lines (2011), for which she received her third NAACP Image Award.

From 2014 to 2022, Ross starred as Dr. Rainbow Johnson in the ABC comedy series, Black-ish. Her work on it has earned her six NAACP Image Awards and a Golden Globe Award for Best Actress – Television Series Musical or Comedy. She has also received nominations for two Critics' Choice Television Awards and five Primetime Emmy Awards for Outstanding Lead Actress in a Comedy Series. In 2019, she co-created a prequel spin-off of Black-ish titled Mixed-ish. In 2020, she starred in and recorded the soundtrack album for the musical film The High Note.

Early life
Ross was born October 29, 1972 in Los Angeles, California, the daughter of Motown singer/actress Diana Ross and music business manager Robert Ellis Silberstein. Actor and musician Evan Ross is her half-brother. Her father is Jewish; her mother is African-American and a Baptist. She adopted the name Tracee Ellis Ross, wishing to retain both of her parents' names after her father dropped the name Silberstein. She has two sisters, Rhonda Ross Kendrick and Chudney Lane Silberstein.

In the 80s, Tracee was photographed along with her mother, Rhonda and Chudney by Andy Warhol. Her mother used her own photo for the cover of her 1982 album, Silk Electric, to which Warhol was given credit.

When her mother married Arne Næss Jr. in 1985, Tracee gained three step-siblings: Katinka, Christoffer, and folk singer Leona Naess. She remains on close terms with all of them. Before her mother and Naess divorced in 2000, they welcomed her two half-brothers, Ross Arne in 1987 and Evan Ross in 1988.

Ross attended The Dalton School in Manhattan, Riverdale Country School in the Bronx and the Institut Le Rosey in Switzerland. She was a model in her teens. She attended Brown University, where she appeared in plays, and graduated in 1994 with a theatre degree. She later worked in the fashion industry as a model and contributing fashion editor to Mirabella and New York magazines.

Ross has ptosis, slightly affecting her left eye-lid. Following a speech at the American Music Awards, Internet trolls commented on her condition, leading her to post an Instagram video saying, "I know y'all make fun of my eyes, you know what I mean? Well, f**ck off, 'cause it's not my fault, alright? My body does what it does, I don't know why. But sometimes when I'm tired, this one just gives up, and it's like, 'Goodnight!'..."Go ahead, make fun of my eyes, OK? But I think they're nice, I think they're so nice, I do."

Career

Early works
Ross made her big-screen debut in 1996, playing a Jewish/African-American woman in the independent feature film Far Harbor. The following year, she debuted as host of The Dish, a Lifetime TV magazine series keeping tabs on popular culture. In 1998, she starred as a former high school track star who remained silent about having been abused at the hands of a coach, in the NBC made-for-TV movie Race Against Fear: A Moment of Truth. Her next role was an independent feature film titled Sue. In 2000, she landed her first major studio role in Diane Keaton's Hanging Up. That same year, she broke into comedy as a regular performer in the MTV series The Lyricist Lounge Show, a hip-hop variety series mixing music, dramatic sketches, and comedic skits. In February 2006 she starred in Kanye West’s "Touch The Sky" MTV music video, playing the role of the best friend of Kanye's ex.

2000–2013: Breakthrough with Girlfriends 
Ross's biggest career achievement came when she landed the lead role in the hit UPN/The CW series Girlfriends, starring as the show's protagonist Joan Carol Clayton — a successful (and often neurotic) lawyer looking for love, challenges, and adventure. The series centered on four (later three) young African-American women, and their male best friend. In 2007, Ross won an NAACP Image Award in the category, Outstanding Actress in a Comedy Series for her role on the series. She won a second Image Award for the role in 2009.
In 2007, Ross starred with her brother Evan Ross and Queen Latifah in the HBO movie Life Support. That same year, she appeared in the Tyler Perry theatrical movie Daddy's Little Girls. She appeared in the 2009 film Labor Pains.

In 2010, she appeared in an episode of Private Practice as a pregnant doctor. In 2011, Ross appeared in four episodes of CSI as the estranged wife of Laurence Fishburne's character.

Ross starred in the sitcom Reed Between the Lines with Malcolm-Jamal Warner airing on BET starting in October 2011. She won a third NAACP Image Award for Outstanding Actress in a Comedy Series in 2012 for her performance in the series. In August 2012, it was announced that Ross would not return for Season Two. In 2011, she appeared in the Lifetime film Five directed by Alicia Keys. The performance in the film earned her nominations for an NAACP Image Award and Black Reel Awards for Outstanding Actress in a Television Movie or Mini-Series. In 2012, Ross starred in the NBC drama pilot Bad Girls.

2014–present: Black-ish and mainstream success 

In 2014, Ross was cast in the ABC comedy series Black-ish, opposite Anthony Anderson. She plays the female lead role of Dr. Rainbow Johnson. The series debuted with generally positive reviews from critics. Ross received three NAACP Image Awards and received nominations for two Critics' Choice Television Awards, four Primetime Emmy Awards, and two Screen Actors Guild Awards for her performance in the series. Ross's 2016 nomination for Outstanding Lead Actress in a Comedy Series was the first for an African-American woman in that category in 30 years. The same year, Ross and Anderson faced off on Spike's Lip Sync Battle. She emerged victorious with performances of Nicki Minaj's "Super Bass" and Pat Benatar's "Love Is a Battlefield".

In 2015, Ross was awarded an honorary doctorate of fine art (honoris causa) by Brown University. Ross hosted the BET Awards in 2015 and 2016, and the American Music Awards in 2017 and 2018. She also hosted  The Fashion Awards in 2019.

As of 2018, as CEO of Pattern Beauty LLC of El Segundo, California, Ross produces a line of "Juicy and Joyful" beauty hair care products made with safe ingredients for curls and promotes support organizations to empower women and people of color. Ross appeared in the fourth episode of A Little Late with Lilly Singh.

In 2019, Ross created, alongside Kenya Barris, a prequel spin-off of Black-ish called Mixed-ish. Ross serves as a narrator for the series starring Tika Sumpter and Mark-Paul Gosselaar. Ross will star in and executive produce the adult animated comedy Jodie, the first in a series of spin-offs based on MTV's Daria franchise. Ross will voice the title character, Jodie Landon.

In 2020, Ross played the leading role as Grace Davis, the legendary superstar singer, in the musical comedy-drama film The High Note for Focus Features. The High Note marks the first big-screen role for Ross since the 2007 comedy-drama Daddy’s Little Girls. The film was scheduled to be theatrically released on May 8, 2020, but the theatrical release was cancelled due to the COVID-19 pandemic. The film later moved its release date to May 29, 2020, through video on demand. In The High Note Ross made her singing debut, recording a soundtrack album titled The High Note (Original Motion Picture Soundtrack). The lead single, pop-ballad "Love Myself" was released on May 15, 2020, through Republic Records.

Ross emceed the second night of the 2020 Democratic National Convention. In September 2020, she signed a deal with ABC Signature. In 2021, she was included on the Time 100, Times annual list of the 100 most influential people in the world.

In 2022, after ending of Black-ish, Ross appeared as Lainie in the seventh episode of the revived The Kids in the Hall, released in May 2022. She produced The Hair Tales, a limited docuseries for hulu and Oprah Winfrey Network. Later in 2022, she starred in the upcoming psychological thriller film, Cold Copy. She starred in the upcoming Erasure adaptation opposite Jeffrey Wright. In 2023, she was cast opposite Eddie Murphy in the holiday comedy Candy Cane Lane directed by Reginald Hudlin.

Filmography

Film

Television

Music videos

Discography
The High Note (Original Motion Picture Soundtrack) (2020)
"Love Myself" (single)
"Stop For A Minute"
"Bad Girl"
"New To Me"
"Like I Do" - with Kelvin Harrison Jr.
Love Myself (Film Version) - with Amie Doherty

Awards and nominations

Business 
Tracee Ellis Ross is also the founder of Pattern Beauty, a company which makes natural hair care products for curly and textured hair. The company was founded in 2018.

See also 
 African-American Jews

References

External links

 
 
 

Actresses from Los Angeles
African-American actresses
American film actresses
American television actresses
Brown University alumni
Living people
Alumni of Institut Le Rosey
20th-century American actresses
21st-century American actresses
Dalton School alumni
Best Musical or Comedy Actress Golden Globe (television) winners
African-American Jews
Riverdale Country School alumni
Silberstein family
California Democrats
20th-century African-American women
20th-century African-American people
21st-century African-American women
21st-century African-American people
1972 births